You Axed for It! is the first studio album by American heavy metal band the Mentors.

On its original vinyl and cassette release (and the reissue in 2009 on Stool Sample Records), the track "Judgement Day" fades out after the final line, "Hallelujah, we're here to stay", is sung. On the 1997 CD reissue by Maximum Metal, the full version of the track is restored and includes an extra guitar solo and an extra lyric, "Mentors, all the way". The extra lyric was included on the lyric sheet in 1985.

Track listing

Personnel
 El Duce — drums, lead vocals
 Sickie Wifebeater — guitar, backing vocals
 Dr. Heathen Scum — bass, backing vocals

1985 albums
Mentors (band) albums